Mount Lira is a mountain located  east of the Condon Hills, in Enderby Land, Antarctica. The geology of this feature was investigated by the Soviet Antarctic Expedition of 1961–62, which called it "Gora Lira" (lyre mountain), probably because of its shape.

References

External links

Mountains of Enderby Land